James Lindsay (26 February 1869 – 9 June 1928) was a British actor.

Lindsay was born in Devon, England, UK and died in Melbourne, Australia at age 59.

Selected filmography
 In the Ranks (1914)
 Lost and Won (1915)
 The Lyons Mail (1916)
 Her Greatest Performance (1916)
 Dr. Wake's Patient (1916)
 The Girl Who Loves a Soldier (1916)
 A Gamble for Love (1917)
 The Snare (1918)
 A Fortune at Stake (1918)
 Missing the Tide (1918)
 The Admirable Crichton (1918)
 A Member of Tattersall's (1919)
 Damaged Goods (1919)
 Mrs. Thompson (1919)
 Edge O' Beyond (1919)
 A Little Bit of Fluff (1919)
 Aunt Rachel (1920)
 The Honeypot (1920)
 The Grip of Iron (1920)
 Nance (1920)
 For Her Father's Sake (1921)
 Love Maggy (1921)
 All Sorts and Conditions of Men (1921)
 The Bachelor's Club (1921)
 The Game of Life (1922)
 What Price Loving Cup? (1923)
 Rogues of the Turf (1923)
 M'Lord of the White Road (1923)
 What Price Loving Cup? (1923)
 Afterglow (1923)
 The Temptation of Carlton Earle (1923)
 Lights of London (1923)
 The Cost of Beauty (1924)
 Claude Duval (1924)
 The World of Wonderful Reality (1924)
 The Choice (1925)
 Forbidden Cargoes (1925)
 Beating the Book (1926)
 The Rat (1926)
 One of the Best (1927)

References

External links
 

1869 births
1928 deaths
20th-century English male actors
British expatriate male actors in Australia
English expatriates in Australia
English male film actors
English male silent film actors
Male actors from Devon